Cuori agitati (Troubled Hearts) is the debut album by Italian pop/rock singer Eros Ramazzotti, produced by Piero Cassano and released in 1985  on the BMG label.

Ramazzotti had won the 'New Voices' category in the 1984 San Remo Music Festival with the song "Terra promessa", which went on to peak at #2 on the Italian Singles Chart and is included here.  At the 1985 San Remo Festival, Ramazzotti entered the main competition with "Una storia importante", which placed sixth but subsequently topped the Italian chart and also reached # 2 in France.  Cuori agitati made #10 on the Italian Albums chart.

Track listing

Singles 
"Terra promessa" (Italy #2)
"Una storia importante" (Italy #1, France #2, Switzerland #7)

Certifications and sales

References

Eros Ramazzotti albums
1985 debut albums
Sony Music Italy albums